Benoît Paire chose to not defend his last year's title.

Andreas Haider-Maurer won the title after defeating Adrian Ungur 3–6, 7–5, 6–2 in the final.

Seeds

Draw

Finals

Top half

Bottom half

References
 Main Draw
 Qualifying Draw

BRD Brasov Challenger - Singles
BRD Brașov Challenger